You Can Write Chinese is a 1945 picture book by Kurt Wiese. A boy learns to write some basic Chinese characters. The book was a recipient of a 1946 Caldecott Honor for its illustrations.

References

1945 children's books
American picture books
Caldecott Honor-winning works
Viking Press books
Picture books by Kurt Wiese
Children's books about China
Chongqing in fiction
Chinese language